De Férias com o Ex: Caribe (English: Ex On The Beach: Caribbean), known as  La Venganza de los Ex: Caribe in Latin America, is a Brazilian reality television series created by ViacomCBS International Studios (VIS) and produced and aired by MTV Brazil, MTV Latin America and Paramount+, based on the British television series Ex on the Beach.

The series was first announced in September 21, 2021 as the successor to De Férias com o Ex and premiered on January 13, 2022, simultaneously throughout South America. It is the first bilingual series in the Ex on the Beach franchise.

Season overview

Other appearances
In addition to appearing on De Férias com o Ex: Caribe, some of the cast members went on to compete in other reality TV shows.

Power Couple

References

External links 
 Official website 

MTV original programming
Brazilian reality television series
Mexican reality television series
2022 Brazilian television series debuts
2022 Mexican television series debuts
Television shows filmed in Colombia
Ex on the Beach